Racket Club is an album by American jazz guitarist Joe Morris, which was recorded in 1993 and released on the About Time label. It was the second part of what Morris calls "Big Loud Electric Guitar" experiments, that started with Sweatshop.

Reception

In his review for AllMusic, Thom Jurek notes that "this is an inverse portrait of Ornette Coleman's Prime Time band, a group that, at least here, deeply influenced Morris, not only in terms of composition and improvisation, but his tonal technical approach to the guitar."

In a review for JazzTimes Larry Appelbaum states "It's a white-knuckle, noisy, wild trip of a CD, great for head banging."

Track listing
All compositions by Joe Morris
 "Rumble Strip" – 8:28
 "Revolve" – 9:45
 "Wedge" – 6:40
 "Cellular" – 6:22
 "Vapor" – 11:28
 "Pointyhead (Parts 1 & 2)" – 4:49
 "Instinct" – 8:00
 "Slipshod" – 8:42

Personnel
 Joe Morris - guitar
 Jim Hobbs – alto sax
 Steve Norton – baritone sax
 Nate McBride –  electric bass
 Jerome Deupree – drums
 Curt Newton – drums

References

1998 albums
Joe Morris (guitarist) albums